Sapphirina, whose members are commonly known as sea sapphires, is a genus of parasitic copepods in the family Sapphirinidae.

Description 
Various species of male Sapphirina shine in different hues, from bright gold to deep blue. This is partially due to structural coloration in which microscopic layers of crystal plates inside their cells which are separated by minute distances, and these distances equal the same wavelength of the corresponding color of their "shine". The females are translucent, as are the males when they are not shining.

Species 
The genus Sapphirina consists of the following species:

 Sapphirina angusta Dana, 1849
 Sapphirina aureofurca Giesbrecht, 1891
 Sapphirina auronitens Claus, 1863
 Sapphirina bella Dana, 1849
 Sapphirina bicuspidata Giesbrecht, 1891
 Sapphirina clausii (Haeckel, 1864)
 Sapphirina coruscans Dana, 1849
 Sapphirina cylindrica Lubbock, 1860
 Sapphirina danae Lubbock, 1856
 Sapphirina darwinii Haeckel, 1864
 Sapphirina detonsa Dana, 1849
 Sapphirina edwardsii (Haeckel, 1864)
 Sapphirina elegans Lubbock, 1860
 Sapphirina fulgens Templeton, 1836
 Sapphirina gastrica Giesbrecht, 1891
 Sapphirina gegenbauri (Haeckel, 1864)
 Sapphirina gemma Dana, 1852
 Sapphirina gibba Rose, 1929
 Sapphirina granulosa Giesbrecht, 1891
 Sapphirina inaequalis Dana, 1852
 Sapphirina indicator J. V. Thompson, 1829
 Sapphirina indigotica Dana, 1849
 Sapphirina intestinata Giesbrecht, 1891
 Sapphirina iris Dana, 1849
 Sapphirina lactens Giesbrecht, 1893
 Sapphirina lomae Esterly, 1905
 Sapphirina longifurca A. Scott, 1909
 Sapphirina maculosa Giesbrecht, 1893
 Sapphirina metallina Dana, 1849
 Sapphirina nigromaculata Claus, 1863
 Sapphirina nitens Lubbock, 1860
 Sapphirina obesa Dana, 1849
 Sapphirina obtusa Dana, 1849
 Sapphirina opaca Lubbock, 1856
 Sapphirina opalina Dana, 1849
 Sapphirina opalina-darwini Lehnhofer, 1929
 Sapphirina orientalis Dana, 1849
 Sapphirina ovalis Dana, 1849
 Sapphirina ovata Dana, 1849
 Sapphirina ovatolanceolata Dana, 1849
 Sapphirina ovatolanceolata-gemma Lehnhofer, 1929
 Sapphirina pachygaster Claus, 1863
 Sapphirina parva Lubbock, 1860
 Sapphirina pseudolactens Lehnhofer, 1929
 Sapphirina pyrosomatis Giesbrecht, 1893
 Sapphirina reticulata Brady, 1883
 Sapphirina sali Farran, 1929
 Sapphirina salpae Claus, 1859
 Sapphirina scalaris Fischer, 1860
 Sapphirina scarlata Giesbrecht, 1891
 Sapphirina serrata Brady, 1883
 Sapphirina sinuicauda Brady, 1883
 Sapphirina splendens Dana, 1852
 Sapphirina stellata Giesbrecht, 1891
 Sapphirina stylifera Lubbock, 1856
 Sapphirina tenella Dana, 1849
 Sapphirina thomsoni Lubbock, 1860
 Sapphirina uncinata Leuckart, 1853
 Sapphirina versicolor Dana, 1849
 Sapphirina vorax Giesbrecht, 1891

See also 
 Dolioletta gegenbauri – a gelatinous doliolid that is preyed upon by S. nigromaculata

References

External links 
 

Poecilostomatoida